This article is about the list of Boavista Futebol Clube da Praia players.  Boavista Futebol Clube da Praia is a Cape Verdean football (soccer) club based in Praia, Cape Verde and plays at Estádio da Várzea.  The club was formed on 5 July 1939.

One of the greatest players were Caló and was one of the players that had the most appearances in club history.

List of players

Notes

References

External links
Boavista FC Praia Facebook Page - Official website

 
Boavista
Association football player non-biographical articles